Lisa Welander (9 August 1909 - 9 December 2001) was a Swedish neurologist, and was Sweden's first professor of neurology, taking up her professorship at Umeå University from 1964–75.

Career 
Welander graduated from Örebro University in 1928, and became a medical licentiate in Stockholm in 1937. She received her doctorate of medicine in 1952 from the Karolinska Institute and then became an associate professor of neurology there, and in 1953 at the Medical College of the University of Gothenburg. Welander became a professor of neurology at Umeå University from 1964–75.

In 1951 Welander was the first to describe the hereditary muscular disease Welander's distal myopathy, a type of distal muscular dystrophy. Welander is also known for her work with Eric Kugelberg on spinal muscular atrophy (SMA). The juvenile manifestation of the disease SMA type III is named after her and her colleague Kugelberg-Welander disease.

Publications 

 Welander, L. (1951). "Myopathia distalis tarda hereditaria; 249 examined cases in 72 pedigrees." Acta Medica Scandinavica. Supplementum. 265:1-124.
 Kugelberg, E., Welander, L. (1956). "Heredofamilial juvenile muscular atrophy simulating muscular dystrophy". Archives of Neurology and Psychiatry. 75(5): 500-509. doi:10.1001/archneurpsyc.1956.02330230050005
 Welander, L. (1957). "Homozygous Appearance of Distal Myopathy". Acta Genetica et Statistica Medica. 7(2): 321-325. doi:10.1159/000150998
 Welander, L. (1961). Genetic research in muscular diseases in Sweden. In Proceeding df the Second International Congress of Human, Genetics. Roma. 3:1629-1636.

References 

1909 births
Swedish neurologists
Women neurologists
Karolinska Institute alumni
Academic staff of Umeå University
2001 deaths
20th-century Swedish scientists
20th-century Swedish women